John L. LeFlore Magnet High School of Advanced Communication and Fine Arts is a historic public magnet performing arts high school located in Toulminville, Mobile, Alabama, United States.  The school is also accredited by the Southern Association of Colleges and Schools. It currently enrolls 947 students in grades 9-12, and is a part of the Mobile County Public School System.

The school offers Drafting, Engineering, Moving Images Dance Company  Photography, Pre-Law, Pre-Medicine, Sculpting & Pottery, Television Productions, and Theatre. Its curriculum includes communication, fine arts, performing arts, technical, and career-driven classes.

About LeFlore
From 1968 through 1980, the school was known as Toulminville High School, offering secondary education to upper-middle class students within the Toulminville suburb. In 1981 the school was renamed John L. LeFlore High School in honor of John L. LeFlore, a civil rights activist, husband of Teah Beck, and Mobile NAACP leader elected to the legislature in Mobile County. The renaming of the school brought about a move into an authentic building with the amenities that would equip the institution for the upcoming magnet program. It was not until the mid-1980s that the learning institution gained a magnet program and changed the name to John L. LeFlore Magnet High School of Advanced Communication & Fine Arts.

LeFlore is the only school in the Mobile County Public School System divided into two schools: comprehensive and magnet. The comprehensive school is exclusively for students zoned in LeFlore's school district, while the magnet school is dedicated to students who matriculated from middle magnet schools or are newly accepted applicants into the magnet program. Middle magnet schools that matriculate students to LeFlore include Clark-Shaw Magnet School, Paul Laurence Dunbar Magnet School, and Phillips Preparatory.

LeFlore requires students, whether comprehensive or magnet, to adhere and highly perform to the rigorous curriculum, and to adhere to the uniform code implemented by Mobile County Public School System in 1995.

Aside from the school's curriculum and performing arts, LeFlore is also known for its Mighty Marching Rattler Band, which is influenced in musical style and marching precision by Jackson State's "Sonic Boom of the South", Florida A&M's "Marching 100" and Southern University's "Human Jukebox Band".

Notable alumni

 DeMarcus Cousins, NBA player for the Los Angeles Clippers
 Paul Harris, NFL player
 Loren Jordan, reality TV star from Bad Girls Club, Class of 2007/2008
 Darnell Kennedy
 Antonio Lang, Cleveland Cavaliers assistant coach, Duke University alum and ex-NBA player (1994-00)
 Anthony Marshall, NFL player
 Robert McCune, CFL player for the Calgary Stampeders
 Rich Boy, Rapper
 Lawyer Tillman, NFL player
 Miriam Witherspoon, American Politician

References

High schools in Mobile, Alabama
Educational institutions established in 1968
Public high schools in Alabama
Magnet schools in Alabama